The following is a family tree of Malay monarchs of Brunei.
 

Brunei
Monarchy in Brunei